West Ashley, or more formally, west of the Ashley, is one of the six distinct areas of the city proper of Charleston, South Carolina. As of July 2022, its estimated population was 83,996. Its name is derived from the fact that the land is west of the Ashley River.

Description
The first neighborhoods west of the Ashley were developed in the postwar period of the 1950s. The area is flanked by the scenic waterfront vistas and marshes of the Ashley and Stono rivers and ancient moss-draped oak trees. The largest residential and business development took place during the 1970s and 80s following suburban highway development that eased commuting. . As Interstate 526 (I-526) was built in the early 1980s and the South Carolina Highway 461 (SC 461 (Glenn McConnell Parkway) was built in the 1990s to accommodate traffic on the historic SC 61 (Ashley River Road) corridor, explosive residential and commercial growth took place in the area. Major retailers located in this community as the large plots of land needed for "big box" stores was not available on the historic downtown Charleston peninsula.

West Ashley's original neighborhoods line (U.S. Route 17 (US 17; Savannah Highway)) in an area closest to the historic Charleston peninsula. The earliest retail district, built in the 1950s, is being revitalized, attracting many art and design-oriented businesses in the early 21st century..

The community's major arteries include SC 7 (Sam Rittenberg Boulevard), SC 61 (Ashley River Road), US 17 (Savannah Highway), SC 461 (Paul Cantrell Boulevard/Glenn McConnell Parkway), and I-526. It is also served by the West Ashley Greenway, a popular rail trail that parallels Savannah Highway.

West Ashley is home to Citadel Mall, the region's largest indoor shopping mall, and the city's newest hospital, Bon Secours St. Francis Hospital. These two constitute major employers of the region.. WCSC-TV Channel 5, the area's CBS affiliate and first television station to sign on the air in Charleston in 1953, moved to a newly constructed broadcast facility in West Ashley in 1997. West Ashley has an independent weekly community newspaper called West Of, which publishes news pertaining to the area .

West Ashley is not a self-governed city or town. The majority of the area west of the Ashley is located within the city limits of Charleston. A few remaining pockets in unincorporated Charleston County are served by the Saint Andrews Public Service District, which provides municipal services for areas outside the city limits.

History

West Ashley is noted as the birthplace of Charleston, where English colonists established the first permanent settlement in the Carolina colony at Albemarle Point in 1670. Local Native Americans, particularly the Kiawah, led the colonists from the ship Carolina to a suitable settling ground. It is believed that the Indians welcomed the colonists, in the hope they might provide defense against the constant raids by the slaving Westo Indians from Georgia (originally known as the Erie). The original settlement, which was built in an unorganized manner, built fortifications early on due to fears of an invasion by the Spanish. In 1680, the settlement was relocated to the Charleston peninsula, in-between the Ashley and Cooper rivers. The  area of the original settlement's location has been preserved as a state historic site known as Charles Towne Landing.

A few skirmishes took place there in the American Revolution during which time parts of the area faced occupation by British forces, specifically at Rantowles Creek, where William Washington defeated cavalry forces under Banastre Tarleton, and at Old St. Andrew's Presbyterian Church during the 1780 Siege of Charleston conducted by the British. Thousands of slaves escaped to British lines and some fought with the British, qualifying for freedom and evacuation with their troops when the British withdrew from the colony.

For much of its history, West Ashley had a focus primarily on agriculture, hosting several slave plantations prior to the Civil War.

Some military activity took place here during the Civil War. The area had several batteries, including those at Fort Bull (near present-day Bees Ferry Road), but no major battles occurred. Sherman's forces did burn down Middleton Place Plantation in the 1865 march to the sea. The Charleston and Savannah Railway extended from downtown to West Ashley during the 19th century, and the Union had attempted to cut it off in 1864, but were beaten back at the Battle of Burden's Causeway on nearby Johns Island.

West Ashley also includes the historic location of Maryville, a defunct town. Originally chartered in 1886, Maryville included the site of the original English settlement, now the site of Charles Towne Landing State Historic Park, and a plantation owned by the Lords Proprietors. Land at the former plantation site was divided up and sold to African American residents in the late 1880s. Following the death of her husband, Mary Mathews Just purchased land at the site of the former Hillsborough Plantation and named Maryville for herself. The South Carolina General Assembly revoked the town's charter in 1936, despite its success as a model for African American "self government."

Ashley Hall Plantation and Magnolia Plantation and Gardens are listed on the National Register of Historic Places.

West Ashley neighborhoods 

 Air Harbor
 Albemarle Point
 Ardmore
 Asheford Place
 Ashland Plantation
 Ashley Forest
 Ashley Hall Manor
 Ashley Hall Plantation
 Ashley Harbor
 Ashley Park Townhomes
 Ashley Towne Landing
 Ashleyville
 Avondale
 Battery Haig
 Bolton's Landing
 Byrnes Downs
 Canterbury Woods
 Capri Isle
 Carolina Bay
 Carolina Terrace
 Charlestowne Estates
 Church Creek
 Citadel Woods
 Croghan Landing
 Dogwood
 Drayton on the Ashley
 East Oak Forest
 Edgewater Park
 Forest Lakes
 Geddes Hall
 Governor's Point
 Grand Oaks Plantation
 Harrison Acres
 Heathwood
 Hickory Farms
 Hickory Hill
 Hunt Club
 Huntington Woods
 Hutton Place
 Indigo Point
 Isle De Nemours
 Lenevar
 MacLaura Hall
 Magnolia Bluff 
 Marsh Cove
 Maryville
 McLaura Bluff
 Melrose
 Memminger Hall
 Middleborough Estates
 Middleton Cove
 Moreland
 Northbridge Terrace
 Old Towne Acres
 Orange Grove Estates
 Orange Grove Shores
 Orleans Woods
 Parkdale
 Parkshore
 Parkshore 3
 Parkwood Estates
 Pierpont
 Pinecrest Gardens
 Pinepoint
 Ponderosa
 Providence Commons
 Red Top
 Rice Hollow
 Rotherwood Estates
 Saint Andrews
 Sandhurst
 Savannah (The)
 Schieveling Plantation
 Shadowmoss Plantation
 Sherwood Forest
 South Windermere
 Springfield
 Stone Creek
 Stono Park
 Sunday Hill
 Sylvan Shores
 The Crescent
 Village Green
 Wappoo Heights
 Wappoo Shores
 Washington Park
 Wespanee Plantation
 West Ashley Plantation
 West Oak Forest
 Westwood
 Windermere

Education
The community formerly served by two public high schools is now served by one, West Ashley High School, with 2017 students and 135 full-time teachers. West Ashley High School was created by the merging of Middleton and St. Andrews high schools. There are also seven public elementary schools (Drayton Hall, Springfield, St. Andrews School of Math and Science, Oakland, Stono Park, Orange Grove, and Ashley River Creative Arts), and four public middle schools (C.E. Williams, Orange Grove, Montessori Community School, and West Ashley). Among the numerous private schools in the West Ashley area are Porter-Gaud School, a K-12 grade college preparatory school founded in 1867.

Major shopping centers 

 Ashley Crossing
 Ashley Landing (formerly Ashley Plaza Mall)
 Citadel Mall
 Crossroads Centre
 Harrell Square
 Indigo Village
 Northbridge Shopping Center
 Orange Grove Plaza
 Outback Plaza (formerly Citadel Plaza)
 Quadrangle Shopping Center
 South Windermere Center
 St. Andrews Center
 Village Square
 West Ashley Shoppes
 Westwood Plaza (formerly Grant City West)

Notable people

Darius Rucker, lead singer of the band Hootie and the Blowfish, grew up in West Ashley. He graduated from Middleton High School.
Stephen Colbert, host of The Late Show with Stephen Colbert, graduated from Porter-Gaud School located in West Ashley.

References

External links with photos of West Ashley 
West Of newspaper, official website
CharlesTowne Landing State Historic Site
Ashley River Road Links
Historic Drayton Hall
Historic Magnolia Plantation & Gardens
The Official Website of the City of Charleston
Byrnes Downs Garden Club Scrapbook
west of the Ashley - Charleston, SC — forum for community events and issues

Neighborhoods in Charleston, South Carolina